Erie Lackawanna Trail is a rail trail located in Lake County, Indiana which runs along the former Erie Lackawanna Railway. The trail begins in the city of Hammond then passes through the towns of Highland, Griffith, Schererville, and Merrillville before coming to an end in the county seat Crown Point.

History
The original Erie-Lackawanna right-of-way was an important freight route through Lake County; although, with the decline of railroad traffic in the United States, the line was abandoned in 1986 by Conrail. After it was abandoned, plans were made by Hammond's Parks and Recreation Department to develop the former right-of-way into a trail system. The first portions of the Erie Lackawanna Trail were created in the mid-1990s, having been continually extended since then.

The trail currently connects to the Monon Trail in downtown Hammond, and the Oak Savannah Trail in Griffith. The Erie Lackawanna is in the vicinity of Pennsy Greenway in Schererville.  Today, the trail is a shared use path, complete with trailheads, park amenities, and local attractions near it. It is currently the longest contiguous trail in Northwest Indiana.

Visitor attractions along the trail
 Hammond Civic Center
 Indiana Visitors' Center
 Wicker Memorial Park
 Griffith Historical Park & Railroad Museum
 Ivan Gatlin Nature Preserve

See also
 Cycling in Chicago
 American Discovery Trail

References

External links
 
 
 

Rail trails in Indiana
Bike paths in the Chicago metropolitan area
Protected areas of Lake County, Indiana
Transportation in Lake County, Indiana
1990s establishments in Indiana